Been in the Storm So Long: The Aftermath of Slavery is a 1979 book by American historian Leon Litwack, published by Knopf. The book chronicles the African-American experience following the 1863 Emancipation Proclamation.

In 1980, the book won the American Book Award and the Pulitzer Prize for History.

References 

1979 non-fiction books
Books about African-American history
Alfred A. Knopf books
20th-century history books
Pulitzer Prize for History-winning works
Reconstruction Era